Tomas 'Elof' Elofsson (born August 18, 1977 in Östersund, Sweden), is guitarist/songwriter. He founded the Death Metal band Sanctification in 2001. In 2003 he joined the Death Metal band 'God Among Insects' playing bass for them until 2008. In 2004 he joined the Death Metal band 'In Battle' as guitarist, playing for them until 2007.   In 2010 he joined the Melodic Death Metal band Hypocrisy as the touring second guitarist, playing his first show with them on January 24, 2010 in Hamburg, Germany. Tomas continues on with his work for his band Sanctification, writing and recording new material. Tomas is an ATV enthusiast, enjoying Snowmobile's and Dirt Bikes when writing, recording and touring permit him to do so.

Bands
 Sanctification: 2001–2010
 God Among Insects: 2003–2008
 In Battle: 2004–2007
 Hypocrisy: 2010–present
 Berzerker Legion: 2013-present

Discography
 Sanctification: Misanthropic Salvation – 2003 (Guitarist)
 God Among Insects: World Wide Death – 2004 (Bassist)
 God Among Insects: Zombienomicon – 2006 (Bassist)
 Sanctification: Black Reign 2009 (Guitarist)
 Berzerker Legion: Obliterate the weak 2020 (Guitarist)

References 

Tomas Elofsson via a series of questions
Hypocrisy

External links 
 Sanctification on Myspace
 Sanctification at Encyclopaedia Metallum
 Sanctification at Metal Kingdom
  God Among Insects at Encyclopaedia Metallum
 God Among Insects on Myspace
 In Battle on Myspace
 In Battle at Encyclopaedia Metallum
 Hypocrisy official website
 Hypocrisy on Myspace

Living people
Swedish heavy metal bass guitarists
1977 births
21st-century bass guitarists